Saint Candida the Elder (died 78 AD) was a supposed early Christian saint and resident of Naples, Italy. 

According to her legend, Candida was an elderly woman who hospitably welcomed Saint Peter the Apostle, when he was passing through Naples on his way to Rome. The woman was cured of an illness by Saint Peter and converted to Christianity. She was baptized by Peter and later converted Aspren, the first bishop of Naples, to Christianity.

She is one of the patron saints of Naples. Basil Watkins OSB says she probably never existed. Her name has been deleted from the revised Roman Martyrology.

Notes

78 deaths
1st-century Christian saints
Year of birth unknown
1st-century Christian female saints
People from Naples
1st-century Roman women
Christianity in Naples
Romans from unknown gentes